EKS  may refer to:

Airports 
 Big Sky Airport, in Montana, United States
 Shakhtyorsk Airport, in Sakhalin Oblast, Russia

Other uses 
 EKS (company), a Finnish disk jockey hardware manufacturer
 EKS (satellite system), an advanced Russian early warning satellite programme
 EKS RX, a World Rallycross Championship team from Sweden
 Internationalist Communist Left, a former Turkish political party
 X, the twenty-fourth letter of the modern English alphabet